The 2003 Cross River State gubernatorial election occurred on April 19, 2003, in Nigeria. Incumbent Governor, PDP's Donald Duke won election for a second term, defeating his immediate past deputy John Oyom Okpa of the ANPP and three other candidates.

Donald Duke emerged winner in the PDP gubernatorial primary election. His running mate was Walter Eneji.

Electoral system
The Governor of Cross River State is elected using the plurality voting system.

Results
A total of five candidates registered with the Independent National Electoral Commission to contest in the election. Incumbent Governor, PDP's Donald Duke won election for a second term, defeating four other candidates.

The total number of registered voters in the state was 1,289,192, and 83.32% (i.e. 1,074,132) of registered voters participated in the exercise.

References 

Cross River State gubernatorial elections
Cross River State gubernatorial election
April 2003 events in Nigeria